Ron Wood (29 May 1923 – 13 December 1978) was an  Australian rules footballer who played with Geelong in the Victorian Football League (VFL).

Notes

External links 

1923 births
1978 deaths
Australian rules footballers from Victoria (Australia)
Geelong Football Club players
Geelong West Football Club players